Stalin D. Colinet (born July 17, 1974) is a former defensive tackle and defensive end in the NFL.

Early years
Colinet was born in New York, to a Dominican mother, and a Haitian father. Colinet attended Cardinal Hayes High School where he lettered in football, basketball, and track. He was named Team MVP and a league all-star in his junior and senior years, and he was named to the CHSAA All-Star team as a senior. He was named to the list of the Top 100 High School Student-Athletes to Watch by the Chicago Tribune. Colinet was offered scholarships in basketball to Indiana and Penn State, but turned them down to play football at Boston College.

College career
He played college ball at Boston College. He was one of Boston College's premier defensive lineman and was a team captain his senior year. Colinet was named First Team All-Big East and first Team ECAC in 1996 and voted the Best Defensive Player in New England.

Colinet ranks 3rd in all-time tackles for a loss at Boston College.

Professional career
Colinet became the first Dominican player to be drafted and play in the NFL when he was selected by the Minnesota Vikings in the third round (78th pick) of the 1997 NFL Draft. Colinet also spent time with the Cleveland Browns and Jacksonville Jaguars.

References

1974 births
Living people
American football defensive tackles
American football defensive ends
Minnesota Vikings players
Cleveland Browns players
Jacksonville Jaguars players
Boston College Eagles football players
Players of American football from New York (state)
American sportspeople of Dominican Republic descent
American sportspeople of Haitian descent
Cardinal Hayes High School alumni